Moorak is a southern suburb of Mount Gambier - a city in South Australia. 

The name Moorak may be a native word for "Mountain", but not from the local tribe, according to Doctor Browne who was an early landowner.

The 2016 Australian census which was conducted in August 2016 reports that Moorak had a population of 1226 people.

Moorak is located within the federal division of Barker, the state electoral district of Mount Gambier and the local government area of the District Council of Grant. It is also part of Mount Gambier’s urban sprawl.

See also
Kilsby sinkhole

References

Towns in South Australia
Limestone Coast